The City of Bunbury is a local government area in the South West region of Western Australia, covering an area of  along the coast about  south of Perth, the capital of Western Australia. The City of Bunbury is one of four local governments comprising the Greater Bunbury sub-region. As at the 2016 Census, the City of Bunbury had an estimated population of almost 32,000.

History

The Municipality of Bunbury was established on 21 February 1871. It absorbed part of the abolished Bunbury Road District, which had surrounded the municipality, on 20 January 1950, leading to the formation of a new Suburban Ward. It gained town status on 1 July 1961, becoming the Town of Bunbury, and assumed its current name when it was granted city status on 8 October 1979.

Wards
The town has 12 councillors and no wards. Each councillor serves a four-year term, and half-elections are held every two years. The mayor is directly elected.

Twin towns and sister cities

The City of Bunbury has a sister / friendship city relationship with:

In 2009, Bunbury-Jiaxing Business Office was established to boost business opportunities between the two regions by assisting with communications and facilitating trade.

Suburbs
The suburbs of the City of Bunbury with population and size figures based on the most recent Australian census:

Population

Heritage-listed places

As of 2023, 336 places are heritage-listed in the City of Bunbury, of which 46 are on the State Register of Heritage Places, among them the Old Bunbury railway station, St Patrick's Cathedral and the Rose Hotel.

List of mayors

Gallery

References

External links
 

Bunbury
Bunbury, Western Australia